The Diocese of the Midwest is a diocese of the Orthodox Church in America (OCA).  Its territory includes parishes, monasteries, and missions located in eleven states in the Midwestern United States – Iowa, Illinois, Indiana, Kansas, Michigan, Minnesota, Missouri, North Dakota, Nebraska, Ohio, and Wisconsin.  The diocesan chancery is located on North LaSalle Street in Chicago, Illinois.

The diocese of the Midwest is under the omophorion of Daniel Brum, archbishop of Chicago and the Midwest.

Deaneries
The diocese is grouped geographically into six deaneries, each consisting of a number of parishes.  Each deanery is headed by a parish priest, known as a dean.  The deans coordinate activities in their area's parishes, and report to the diocesan bishop.  The current deaneries of the Diocese of the Midwest and their territories are:

Chicago Deanery – Illinois, Indiana, and Wisconsin
Cleveland Deanery – Ohio
Kansas City Deanery – Illinois, Kansas, Missouri, and Nebraska
Indianapolis Deanery – Indiana and Ohio
Michigan Deanery – Michigan
Minneapolis Deanery – Iowa, Minnesota, North Dakota, and Wisconsin

See also
St. Peter and St. Paul Orthodox Church

External links
Official site
Holy Trinity Cathedral, the Diocesan See

Midwest
Eastern Orthodoxy in Iowa
Eastern Orthodoxy in Illinois
Eastern Orthodoxy in Indiana
Eastern Orthodoxy in Kansas
Eastern Orthodoxy in Michigan
Eastern Orthodoxy in Minnesota
Eastern Orthodoxy in Missouri
Eastern Orthodoxy in North Dakota
Eastern Orthodoxy in Nebraska
Eastern Orthodoxy in Ohio
Eastern Orthodoxy in Wisconsin

Video About the OCA Diocese of the Midwest